The landscape for instant messaging involves cross-platform instant messaging clients that can handle one or multiple protocols. Clients that use the same protocol can typically federate and talk to one another. The following table compares general and technical information for cross-platform instant messaging clients in active development, each of which have their own article that provide further information.



General

Operating system support

Connectivity

Privacy
Some messaging services that are not designed for privacy require a unique phone number for sign-up, as a form of identity verification and to prevent users from creating multiple accounts.

Some messaging services that do not solely focus on a mobile-first experience, or enforce SMS authentication, may allow email addresses to be used for sign-up instead.

Some messaging services offer greater flexibility and privacy, by allowing users to create more than one account to compartmentalize personal & work purposes, or not requiring personally identifiable information for sign-up.

To find out if the software has end-to-end encryption, see "media" table below.

 1: Apple iOS doesn't allow screenshot protection.

Message handling

Media

Miscellaneous
Messaging services can operate around different models, based on security and accessibility considerations.

A mobile-focused, phone number-based model operates on the concept of primary and secondary devices. Examples of such messaging services include: WhatsApp, Viber, Line, WeChat, Signal, etc. The primary device is a mobile phone and is required to login and send/receive messages. Only one mobile phone is allowed to be the primary device, as attempting to login to the messaging app on another mobile phone would trigger the previous phone to be logged out. The secondary device is a computer running a desktop operating system, which serves as a companion for the primary device. Desktop messaging clients on secondary devices do not function independently, as they are reliant on the mobile phone maintaining an active network connection for login authentication and syncing messages.

A multi-device, device-agnostic model is designed for accessibility on multiple devices, regardless of desktop or mobile. Examples of such messaging services include: Skype, Facebook Messenger, Google Hangouts (subsequently Google Chat), Telegram, ICQ, Element, Slack, Discord, etc. Users have more options as usernames or email addresses can be used as user identifiers, besides phone numbers. Unlike the phone-based model, user accounts on a multi-device model are not tied to a single device, and logins are allowed on multiple devices. Messaging services with a multi-device model are able to eliminate feature disparity and provide identical functionality on both mobile and desktop clients. Desktop clients can function independently, without relying on the mobile phone to login and sync messages.

See also 

Comparison of instant messaging protocols
Comparison of Internet Relay Chat clients
Comparison of VoIP software
 List of SIP software
Comparison of LAN messengers
List of video telecommunication services and product brands
 Comparison of user features of messaging platforms

Notes

References 

Instant Messaging clients
 
Instant messaging clients
Instant messaging clients